The Reverend Lord Frederick de Vere Beauclerk (8 May 1773 – 22 April 1850), a 19th-century Anglican priest, was an outstanding but controversial English first-class cricketer, the leading "amateur" player of the Napoleonic period.

Lord Frederick played for 35 years from 1791 to 1825, and served as President of Marylebone Cricket Club (MCC) for 1826–27.

Early life and ecclesiastical career
Beauclerk was born in London on 8 May 1773, the fourth son of Aubrey, 5th Duke of St Albans and his wife, the former Lady Catherine Ponsonby, daughter of William, 2nd Earl of Bessborough by his wife Lady Caroline Cavendish.

After Eton, Beauclerk went up to Trinity College, Cambridge, being admitted in 1790 aged 17, graduating M.A. 1792, receiving D.D. 1824.

Like other younger sons of the nobility, Beauclerk entered holy orders, being ordained deacon in 1795 and priest in 1797. He was appointed Vicar of Kimpton (1797–1827), being presented in 1827 to the parish of Redbourn and then St Michael's Church, St Albans (1828–1850). However, he "never allowed his clerical duties to interfere materially with the claims of cricket" and "his sermons were legendary for their dullness".

Ecclesiastical ministry
During his ministry in the Church of England, Beauclerk held the following ecclesiastical appointments:

Vicar of Kimpton (1797–1827)
Vicar of Redbourn (1827–1850)
Vicar of St Albans (1828–1850).

Cricket career
Beauclerk was a right-handed batsman and right-arm slow underarm bowler, a recognised all-rounder. He generally fielded at slip. His career spanned the 1791 to 1825 seasons.

Lord Frederick's cricketing talent as an accurate slow bowler was spotted at Cambridge University by the George, 9th Earl of Winchilsea, who invited him to play for MCC. Beauclerk's first-class debut was for MCC v Gentlemen of Kent at Lord's Old Ground on 2 & 3 June 1791. Beauclerk was "now but 18 years of age". He played two first-class matches in the 1791 season then being unavailable until the 1795 season when he completed his Divinity studies; he then developed as a regular and prolific cricket player.

Having started as a bowler, he honed his batting skills becoming better known as a hard-hitting batsman, but Beauclerk always remained a genuine all-rounder.

Beauclerk played for the Gentlemen in the inaugural and second Gentlemen v Players matches in 1806.

Beauclerk scored 170 playing for Homerton against Montpelier in 1807, a match not widely recognised as first-class. This score set a world record for the highest individual innings in all forms of cricket that lasted until 1820 when it was beaten by Viscount Bangor's kinsman, William Ward, who scored 278.

In 1810, Beauclerk and Thomas Howard, cousin of the Earl of Carlisle, were due to play George Osbaldeston and William Lambert in a lucrative single wicket match. Osbaldeston was taken ill just before the match and Beauclerk flatly refused to postpone it, saying: "Play or Pay"!  Lambert had to play on his own but he was a canny professional who was well aware of Beauclerk's weakness: his uncontrollable temper.  By deliberately bowling wide, Lambert caused Beauclerk to lose both his temper and his wicket with the result that Lambert won the match by 15 runs.

The humiliated and vindictive Beauclerk would have his revenge on Osbaldeston and Lambert in years to come but first he used his influence at MCC to secure a change in the Laws of Cricket so that wide balls were for the first time banned in 1811.

In 1817, Beauclerk played in a highly controversial match at Nottingham where he captained an All-England team while Osbaldeston and Lambert were given men for Nottingham. Accusations of match-fixing were made by both sides and Beauclerk was able to produce witnesses who implicated Lambert. As a result, MCC banned Lambert from ever playing again at Lord's Cricket Ground. Osbaldeston's turn came in 1818 after he too lost his temper when beaten at single wicket by George Brown of Sussex. Osbaldeston was so angry that he resigned his MCC membership. Later, he repented and asked to be reinstated but Beauclerk refused his application.

Beauclerk persuaded MCC to call a meeting to ban roundarm bowling in 1822 even though he had been known to claim wagers when playing alongside the early roundarmers like John Willes. According to Lord Harris: "When he [Willes] played on the side of Lord Frederick his bowling was fair, when against him, the contrary".

Beauclerk was the second President of MCC in 1826, playing for its team in minor matches while in office. Thereafter, he was a regular attendee at Lord's to watch matches, from time to time lending his patronage by standing sponsor. A "persistent symbol of insensitive autocracy long after his retirement", he was invariably accompanied by a "nasty, yapping dog" whereas the rule for everyone else was: "No dogs allowed".

Style and technique
Beauclerk was one of the best single wicket players of the 19th century. His batting style was "rather scientific, in the more orthodox manner of the professionals", while his under-arm bowling was very slow, but extremely accurate and he could get the ball to rise abruptly off a length.

Although his batting style was described as scientific, Beauclerk was also impulsive as "he sometimes lost his wicket by trying to cut straight balls". He was a hard-hitting batsman with fine strokeplay, "especially to the off". He improved his batsmanship by modelling himself on William Beldham, but he lacked the latter's natural flair.

Beauclerk was also an astute tactician and it has been recorded that he carefully studied opposing batsmen and had the ability to quickly understand their strengths and weaknesses so that he could set his field accordingly.

Beauclerk wore a white beaver hat when playing, the remainder of his outfit being a white shirt, nankeen breeches, a scarlet sash and white stockings. He once threw his hat down on the pitch in frustration at his inability to dismiss the obdurate batsman Tom Walker, known as "Old Everlasting". Beauclerk called Walker a "confounded old beast" but, when Walker was asked about it afterwards, he shrugged and said: "I don't care what he says".

Personality
Beauclerk became renowned as one of the most controversial figures in cricket history.  His competitive approach to the game was well summarised in a verse written by a contemporary:
My Lord he comes next, and will make you all stareWith his little tricks, a long way from fair.
Much that is hagiography exists about cricketers but "an unqualified eulogy of Beauclerk has never been seen and that is significant". Although he was a cleric and ostensibly against gambling, he estimated that he made up to £600 a year from playing cricket, which at the time was funded mostly by gambling. But Beauclerk as a vicar was "completely devoid of Christian charity". In this vein, Rowland Bowen likened him to Talleyrand as "a cleric without, it would seem, the faintest interest in being a clergyman or any kind of Christian".

Beauclerk has been described as "an unmitigated scoundrel". Among the quotations about him is one that he was a "foul-mouthed, dishonest man who was one of the most hated figures in society ... he bought and sold matches as though they were lots at an auction". Another described him as "cruel, unforgiving, cantankerous and bitter".

In an early example of gamesmanship, he is said to have occasionally suspended an expensive gold watch from the middle stump whilst batting, the inference being that his batting was sound enough, or the bowling bad enough, for it to remain unscathed. Sadly, there is no record of how many watches he lost in this fashion.

When Lord Frederick died in 1850, his unpopularity was such that The Times did not publish his obituary.

Family and personal life

The fourth son and fifth child of the 5th Duke of St Albans, Beauclerk descended from Charles II and Nell Gwyn.

He married the Hon. Charlotte Dillon-Lee, daughter of Charles, 12th Viscount Dillon, on 3 July 1813. They had four children:
 Caroline Henrietta Frederica Beauclerk (1815–1878), married Charles-Eugène Leloup (d. 1878)
 Charles William Beauclerk (1816–1863), married Penelope Hulkes (d. 1890)
 Aubrey Frederick James Beauclerk (1817–1853), late Captain Scots Guards
 Henrietta Mary Beauclerk (1818–1887), married Sir Edward Rokewode Gage, 9th and last Bt.

His sons, Charles and Aubrey Beauclerk, also being in remainder to the dukedom, played first-class cricket as did his nephew, William, 9th Duke of St Albans.

Beauclerk was lord of the manor and patron of the advowson of Winchfield, Hampshire, as well as owning a London town house at 68 Grosvenor Street, Mayfair, where he died aged 76 on 22 April 1850. Buried at St Mary's Church, Winchfield, a tablet in memory of "his many virtues" was erected in the nave by his widow, Lady Frederick Beauclerk.

See also 
 Marylebone Cricket Club
 Dukes of St Albans

References

Bibliography
 H. S. Altham, A History of Cricket, Volume 1 (to 1914), George Allen & Unwin, 1962
 Derek Birley, A Social History of English Cricket, Aurum, 1999
 Rowland Bowen, Cricket: A History of its Growth and Development, Eyre & Spottiswoode, 1970
 Charles Burford, Nell Gwyn: Mistress to a King, Atlantic Monthly Press, 2005
 Arthur Haygarth, Scores & Biographies, Volume 1 (1744–1826), Lillywhite, 1862
 Ashley Mallett, The Black Lords of Summer, Univ. of Queensland Press, 2002
 Mike Thompson, The Lord of Lord's: The Life & Times of Lord Frederick Beauclerk, Christopher Saunders Publishing, 2017.

Further reading
 Donald Adamson, The House of Nell Gwyn: the fortunes of the Beauclerk family, 1670-1974 (jointly with Peter Beauclerk Dewar, 1974).
 Sir John Major, More Than A Game, HarperCollins, 2007
 Burke's Peerage & Baronetage

External links
 www.lords.org
 

1773 births
1850 deaths
People educated at Eton College
Alumni of Trinity College, Cambridge
19th-century English Anglican priests
Cambridge University cricketers
Presidents of the Marylebone Cricket Club
English cricketers
English cricketers of 1787 to 1825
Gentlemen cricketers
Marylebone Cricket Club cricketers
Younger sons of dukes
F
Hampshire cricketers
Surrey cricketers
Middlesex cricketers
Kent cricketers
Epsom cricketers
The Bs cricketers
Colonel C. Lennox's XI cricketers
Gentlemen of England cricketers
Marylebone Cricket Club and Homerton cricketers
Marylebone Cricket Club First 8 with 3 Others cricketers
Marylebone Cricket Club Second 9 with 3 Others cricketers